Boughton is a surname. Notable people with the surname include:

Alice Boughton (1866–1943), American photographer
Chauncey Boughton (1805–1895), American physician and politician
Clive Boughton (born 1956), Australian computer scientist
George H. Boughton (1792–1866), American politician
George Henry Boughton (1833–1905), Anglo-American painter
Joy Boughton (1913–1963), English oboist and music professor
Martha Arnold Boughton (1857–1928), American educator, author

Napoleon Boughton, Commander of the USS Gladiolus during the American Civil War
Rutland Boughton (1878–1960), English composer
William Boughton, English conductor

See also
Boughton Baronets, titled English family line
 John Bowton (also John Bouton, John Boughton) (1636–1707), founding settler of Norwalk, Connecticut